Fiona Crombie (born c. 1973) is an Australian costume and production designer. She was nominated for an Academy Award in the category Best Production Design for the period film The Favourite.

Crombie was born in Adelaide; when she was two, her family moved to Sydney where she attended Turramurra Public School. Crombie graduated in 1988 from the National Institute of Dramatic Art (NIDA) and then became the resident designer at the Sydney Theatre Company.

Crombie is the daughter of film director Donald Crombie. She is married to Peter Knowles and the couple have two children.

Theatre
 Three Sisters, Sydney Theatre Company, 2001
 The Shape of Things, Sydney Theatre Company, January 2003
 Hedda Gabler, Sydney Theatre Company, July 2004; Brooklyn Academy of Music, New York, February 2006
 Journal of the Plague Year, Malthouse Theatre, April 2005
 The Ham Funeral, Malthouse Theatre Company, April 2005
 King Lear, Melbourne Theatre Company, July 2005
 The Cherry Orchard, Sydney Theatre Company, December 2005
 Moving Target (by Marius von Mayenburg), Adelaide Festival, February 2008; Malthouse Theatre, March 2008
 Hamlet, Bell Shakespeare, July 2008
 The Great (by Tony McNamara), Sydney Theatre Company, May 2008
 The City (by Clyde Fitch), Sydney Theatre Company, June 2009
 The Seven Stages of Grieving, Sydney Theatre Company, 2021

Filmography
2011: Snowtown
2012: Beaconsfield
2012: Dead Europe
2013: Top of the Lake
2014: Son of a Gun
2015: Macbeth
2015: Truth
2016: Una
2018: Mary Magdalene
2018: The Favourite
2019: The King
2021: Cruella
2023: Beau Is Afraid
2024: Mickey 17

References

Further reading

External links 
 
 
 Fiona Crombie at HLA Management Australia

1973 births
Living people
People from Adelaide
People from Sydney
National Institute of Dramatic Art alumni
Australian costume designers
Australian production designers
Women production designers